Rubus uhdeanus is a Mexican species of brambles in the rose family. It is native to southern Mexico.

Rubus uhdeanus is a perennial with light hair and a few small curved prickles. Leaves are compound with 3 leaflets. Flowers are white or pink. Fruits are black and elongated.

References

uhdeanus
Flora of Mexico
Plants described in 1874